alpha-Galactosylceramide (α-GalCer, KRN7000) is a synthetic glycolipid derived from structure-activity relationship studies of galactosylceramides isolated from the marine sponge Agelas mauritianus. α-GalCer is a strong immunostimulant and shows potent anti-tumour activity in many in vivo models.

Immunostimulatory properties 
α-GalCer is a potent activator of iNKT cells, and a model CD1d antigen. The invariant T cell receptor of the iNKT cell is able to bind the CD1d:glycolipid complex leading to iNKT cell activation in both mice and humans.

Adjuvant activity 
In combination with a peptide antigen, α-GalCer is able to stimulate a strong immune response against the epitope. The CD1d:glycolipid:TCR interaction activates the iNKT cell which can then activate the dendritic cell. This causes the release of a range of cytokines and licenses the dendritic cell to activate a peptide-specific T cell response. This adjuvant acts through this cellular interaction, rather than through classic pattern recognition receptor pathways.

References 

Immunology
Lipids